The Historic Old Town Commercial District (also known as downtown Lake Worth Beach) is a U.S. historic district (designated as such on September 22, 2001) located in Lake Worth Beach, Florida. The district is bounded by FEC, M Street, Lucerne Avenue, and 1st Avenue S. It contains 46 historic buildings.

References

External links

 Palm Beach County listings at National Register of Historic Places

Buildings and structures in Lake Worth Beach, Florida
Historic districts on the National Register of Historic Places in Florida
National Register of Historic Places in Palm Beach County, Florida